Silvio Smalun (born 2 November 1979 in Erfurt, Thuringia) is a German former competitive figure skater. He is the 2003 Bofrost Cup on Ice bronze medalist, the 2000 Ondrej Nepela Memorial bronze medalist, and a two-time (2001 and 2003) German national champion. He reached the free skate at seven ISU Championships, achieving his best result, 8th, at the 2006 Europeans.

Career 
Silvio Smalun started skating at the age of 5. His first coach was Ilona Schindler. He trained alongside Stefan Lindemann. In 1995, he moved to Oberstdorf where he was coached by Michael Huth. Due to his studies, he trained also in Ulm without his coach. 

Smalun placed 8th at the 2006 European Championships, higher than Stefan Lindemann who was selected for the Olympics. Smalun retired from competitive skating in September 2006.

In autumn 2006, Smalun took part in Katarina Witt's show Stars auf Eis on the German TV station Pro7. His partner was pop-singer Lucy Diakovska (No Angels). The pair finished third despite Smalun having no experience in pairs.

Programs

Competitive highlights 
GP: Grand Prix

References

External links 

 

German male single skaters
Figure skating reality television participants
Sportspeople from Erfurt
1979 births
Living people